Charles Whiting (1926–2007) was a British writer and military historian.

Charles Whiting may also refer to:

Charles Whiting (cricketer) (1888–1959), English cricketer
Charles S. Whiting (1863–1922), Associate Justice of the South Dakota Supreme Court
Charles J. Whiting, American cavalry major
Charlie Whiting (1952–2019), FIA Formula One race director